Randaberg Stadion is an association football stadium just outside the village of Randaberg in the municipality of Randaberg in Rogaland county, Norway. It is the home ground of the Randaberg IL football team.  The stadium was renovated and expanded in 2005.

The record attendance is about 3,500, from a 2007 cup match where Randaberg played Viking.

References

External links
Randaberg Stadion at Randaberg-Fotball.no

Football venues in Norway
Sports venues in Rogaland
Sport in Randaberg